The Armitage–Doll model is a statistical model of carcinogenesis, proposed in 1954 by Peter Armitage and Richard Doll, in which a series of discrete mutations result in cancer. The original paper has recently been reprinted with a set of commentary articles.

The model 

The rate of incidence and mortality from a wide variety of common cancers follows a power law: someone's risk of developing a cancer increases with a power of their age.

The model is very simple, and reads

in Ashley's notation.

Their interpretation was that a series of  mutations were required to initiate a tumour. This is now widely accepted, and part of the mainstream view of carcinogenesis. In their original paper, they found that  was typically between 5 and 7. Other cancers were later discovered to require fewer mutations: retinoblastoma, typically emerging in early childhood, can emerge from as few as 1 or 2, depending on pre-existing genetic factors.

History 

This was some of the earliest strong evidence that cancer was the result of an accumulation of mutations. With their 1954 paper, Armitage and Doll began a line of research that led to Knudson's two-hit hypothesis and thus the discovery of tumour suppressor genes.

References 

Steven A Frank (2004) "Commentary: Mathematical models of cancer progression and epidemiology in the age of high throughput genomics", Int. J. Epidemiol. 33(6): 1179-1181 
Suresh H Moolgavkar (2004) "Commentary: Fifty years of the multistage model: remarks on a landmark paper", Int. J. Epidemiol. 33(6): 1182-1183 
Richard Doll (2004) "Commentary: The age distribution of cancer and a multistage theory of carcinogenesis", Int. J. Epidemiol. 33(6): 1183-1184 

Carcinogenesis
Medical statistics